Monika may refer to:

People and fictional characters
 Monika (given name)

Films
 Monika (1938 film), a German drama
 Monika (1974 film), an Italian comedy

Music
 Monika (opera), a 1937 operetta by Nico Dostal
 Monika Enterprise, a record label
 Monika Christodoulou, a Greek musician known mononymously as Monika
 "Monika" (song), by Island, Cyprus' entry for Cyprus in the Eurovision Song Contest 1981
 "Monika", a 1969 song by Peter Orloff

See also

"Hej Hej Monika", a song by Nic & the Family
 
 Monica (disambiguation)
 Monique (disambiguation)